Jae,Gyebal (Korean: 재,계발, Hanja: 再,啓發) is the second album by South Korean hip-hop duo Leessang. The album was released on May 22, 2003, and contains 14 songs.

Track listing

References

2003 albums
Korean-language albums
Leessang albums
Kakao M albums